The Ekstraliga is the top Polish league for women's association football teams.

The league's first season was in 1979–80. Initially, it was called I liga polska kobiet. The first title holder was Czarni Sosnowiec. In 2005, the league was renamed to Ekstraliga kobiet. The winner of the league qualifies for the UEFA Women's Champions League.

Relegated teams descend to the I liga.

2020/21 clubs 
Source

Format 
Up to the 2009–10 season with six teams in the league, the teams played each other four times per season. Thus each club was totalling 20 matches. The last place after the season got relegated while the 5th-place finisher played a two-legged relegation playoff.

For the 2010–11 season the whole women's football of Poland was reorganized. For the Ekstraliga the change was an increase from 6 teams to 10 teams. For this to happen, two teams from each of the two 2nd divisions were promoted directly to the premier league, and the two 3rd-place finishers played a two-legged playoff with the winner playing a two-legged playoff against the 6th-place finisher from the Ekstraliga.

Since the 2014-15 season, 12 teams participate in the top-tier competition. Since 2015-16, after the regular season, the teams are divided into a championship and relegation group. Points scored during this stage are added to those of the regular season.

List of champions

Titles by club

References

External links
 pzpn.pl – official website?
 90minut.pl
 League at uefa.com
 Polish League at women.soccerway.com; Standings, Results, Fixtures

 

Pol
Women's football leagues in Poland
Women
Sports leagues established in 1979
Women's sports leagues in Poland
Professional sports leagues in Poland